Acharya Harihar Post Graduate Institute of Cancer is a cancer care hospital in Cuttack, India. It is one of the 25 recognized Regional Cancer Centres in India. Founded on 2 February 1981 as the Radiotherapy Department of the SCB Medical College in Cuttack, it was converted into an autonomous body on 24 April 1984.

References 

Regional Cancer Centres in India
Hospitals in Odisha
Cuttack
Hospitals established in 1981
1981 establishments in Orissa